Chaudhary Jagjit Singh was an Indian politician and member of Punjab Legislative Assembly.

Early life
Chaudhary Jagjit Singh was born to Master Gurbanta Singh and Sampuran Kaur at Dhaliwal, Jalandhar, Punjab.

After the death of his father he became his official political heir. Jagjit's younger brother, Santokh Singh Chaudhary is also a big leader and son Chaudhary Surinder Singh is a MLA from Kartarpur.

Politics

His political career started as a Sarpanch of their ancestral village 'Dhariwal Kadian' and then appointed Chairman of Jalandhar Zila Parshad. He also held posts of Chairman of Block Samiti, Managing Director of Cooperative Bank and Chairman of Market Committee.

He also remained the Cabinet Minister of Punjab for Labour and Employment and also Minister of State for Housing and Urban Development. He won the Punjab Assembly election five times continuously from Kartarpur Assembly Constituency in 1980, 1985, 1992, 1997 and 2002.

In 1998, he was appointed the Leader of opposition in Punjab Legislative Assembly and also served as the Vice-President of Punjab Congress Committee.

His name was also floored in Ludhiana City Centre scam.

He died on 4 August 2015 due to heart attack.

References

1934 births
2015 deaths
People from Punjab, India
Indian National Congress politicians from Punjab, India